Maciej Fortuna is a Polish jazz trumpet player, composer and musical educator. He runs the Fortuna Music record label.
Jerzy Milian dedicated his composition "Music For Mr. Fortuna" to Maciej Fortuna.

Education
Maciej graduated from the University of Poznan Law School in 2007 and obtained a master's degree with first class honours from the Academy of Music in Wroclaw, Piotr Wojtasik jazz trumpet class (2010). In 2012 he obtained a doctors degree in performing arts at The Academy of Music in Poznań.

Performances
He has played with artists from Poland, Europe and the USA. He has won prizes as a soloist and with his bands.

Maciej Fortuna is also a session musician for radio or television. He is a lecturer in The Academy of Music in Poznan (Poland), jazz trumpet class.

Group membership
As a leader:
 Maciej Fortuna Solo
 Maciej Fortuna Trio
 Maciej Fortuna Quartet
 Maciej Fortuna Quintet

As co-leader:
 An On Bast/Maciej Fortuna
 Mack Goldsbury Quartet feat. Maciej Fortuna 
 Maciej Fortuna and Stefan Weeke Project

Member of groups:
 Piotr Lemańczyk Quartet, featuring David Kikoski
 Mack Goldsbury and The Polish Connection
 Ernst Bier and Mack Goldsbury Group
 Switch On Quintet

Awards
 Grand Prix, TVP KULTURA prize, TVP President Prize during Young Talent Competition ‘Niemen Non Stop’ in Słupsk (July 2008)
 First prize during Kodolanyi Jazz Competition (July 2008) with Switch On Quintet
 Finalist of Junior Jazz in Usti Nad Laba (2008) with the same group
 finalist of Ist International Tarnow Jazz Contest (2008) with Maciej Fortuna Quintet
 Second prize during Jazz Juniors Competition (2008) with Maciej Fortuna Quintet
 Best soloist prize during Bydgoszcz Big Band Festiwal 2008 and Baszta Jazz Festiwal 2008
 Honourable in the same category during Big Band Festival in Nowy Tomysl (2008)

Discography

Maciej Fortuna/ Krzysztof Dys
 Maciejewski - Variations DUX 1151 (2014)

Fortuna / Goldsbury / Minchello / Grassi
 The Last of The Beboppers Fortuna Music FM 018 (2014)

Maciej Fortuna Ethno Quartet
 Zakhaar Fortuna Music FM 016 (2014)

Fortuna / Fortuna
 Music for Trumpet and Pipe Organ Fortuna Music FM 015 (2014)

Riboflavin
 Full Circle Riboflavin' Inc. (2014)

Mack Goldsbury Quartet feat. Maciej Fortuna
 Active Rush Fortuna Music FM 014 (2013)

Maciej Fortuna Acoustic Quartet
 Jazz From Poland VOL. 1 Fortuna Music FM 012 (2013)

Fortuna / Dys
 Tropy Fortuna Music FM 011 (2013)

Maciej Fortuna Trio
 At Home Fortuna Music FM 008 (2013)
 Sahjia Fortuna Music FM 007 (2012)
 Solar Ring Fortuna Music FM 005 (2012)
 Jazz Fortuna Music FM 021 (2016)

An On Bast & Maciej Fortuna
 Electroacoustic Transcription of Film Music by Krzysztof Penderecki Fortuna Music FM013 (2013)
 Live Fortuna Music FM 010 (2013)
 1 Fortuna Music FM 006 (2012)

Mack Goldsbury Quartet featuring Maciej Fortuna
 Live at CoCo's Cadence Jazz Records (2012)

Piotr Lemańczyk Quartet feat. David Kikoski
 Guru Soliton (2012)

Switch On Quintet
 Our Car Will Never Stop Fortuna Music FM 004 (2011)

Mack Goldsbury and The Polish Connection featuring Reggie Moore
 Salt Miners Blues Fortuna Music FM 003 (2011)

Ernst Bier and Mack Goldsbury Group
 Artesia Sunrise Konnex (2010)

Maciej Fortuna Quartet
 Lost Keys Fortuna Music FM 002 (2010)

Maciej Fortuna and Stefan Weeke Project
 In The Small Hours Fortuna Music FM 001 (2009)

Maciej Fortuna International Quartet
 Zośka Fortuna Music FM 020 (2016)

Maciej Fortuna Quartet with Strings
 ''Jerzy Milian – Music For Mr. Fortuna" Jazz Poznan Association SJP 002 (2016)

External links
 Maciej Fortuna home page

Polish trumpeters
Polish Esperantists
Living people
21st-century trumpeters
Year of birth missing (living people)